The Italian polymath Leonardo da Vinci (1452–1519) was the founding figure of the High Renaissance, and exhibited enormous influence on subsequent artists. Only around eight major works—The Adoration of the Magi, Saint Jerome in the Wilderness, the Louvre Virgin of the Rocks, The Last Supper, the ceiling of the Sala delle Asse, The Virgin and Child with Saint Anne and Saint John the Baptist, The Virgin and Child with Saint Anne and the Mona Lisa—are universally attributed to him, and have aroused little or no controversy in the past. Ten additional works are now widely attributed to his oeuvre, though most have previously incited considerable controversy or doubt: the Annunciation, Madonna of the Carnation, The Baptism of Christ (with his teacher, Verrocchio), Ginevra de' Benci, the Benois Madonna, the Portrait of a Musician (with possible studio assistance), the Lady with an Ermine, La Belle Ferronnière, the London Virgin of the Rocks (with studio assistance), the Portrait of Isabella d'Este and Saint John the Baptist.

Other attributions are more complicated. La Scapigliata appears to be attributed by most scholars, but some prominent specialists are silent on the issue. Salvator Mundis attribution remains extremely controversial, though it can be attributed somewhat securely in part to Leonardo, as the dispute primarily centers around whether Leonardo created the majority of the work, or merely assisted a member of his studio. The small number of surviving paintings is due in part to Leonardo's frequently disastrous experimentation with new techniques and his chronic procrastination, resulting in many incomplete works. Additionally, it is thought that Leonardo created many more works that are now lost, though records and copies have survived for some.

There are eleven surviving manuscripts of his notes and drawings, amounting to thousands of pages. There are numerous other works with disputed attributions to Leonardo, none of which have yet to achieve thorough scholarly approval.

 Major extant works Key:
 Collaborative work
 Possibly collaborative work

 Manuscripts 

 Lost works 

Disputed worksKey':
 Supposedly collaborative work

See also
 Ostrich Egg Globe
 Portraits of Leonardo da Vinci

Notes

Sources for dating

References

Sources

External links 

 Leonardo's works on Universal Leonardo
 Leonardo's works on Web Gallery of Art
 The Codex Arundel on the British Library's Digitised Manuscripts Website
 Works by Leonardo on cavallinitoveronese.co.uk

Leonardo da Vinci